Mill Gate is an old entrance to the city of Stargard, in Poland, which functioned also as a watergate on Ina river. In medieval times the watch lowered a portcullis into the river for the night, which secured Stargard harbour, situated behind the fortification (an exception in this area), from intruders. Both towers have the so-called Stargard blend motive (the same as in St. Mary's church). Today the Mill Gate is the seat of Stargard's Society of Fine Art Lovers. In 2010, due to its historical and artistic values the Mill Gate, along with the medieval city walls of Stargard, was listed by the President of Poland as a Historic Monument of Poland.

See also
Waterpoort, another surviving medieval watergate.

References

Buildings and structures in West Pomeranian Voivodeship
Gates in Poland
Gothic architecture in Poland